Mary-Margaret McMahon (born July 6, 1966) is a Canadian politician. She was elected MPP for the Ontario Liberal Party in Beaches—East York in the June 2022 provincial election. Previously, McMahon served on the Toronto City Council from 2010 to 2018, representing Ward 32 Beaches—East York.

Background
Born and raised in Collingwood, Ontario, she is the daughter of former Collingwood mayor Ron Emo and Gloria Emo. McMahon is one of four children, including brothers Michael, Stephen and Timothy. Since 1990, she has resided in the Beaches—East York area.

McMahon taught English as a second language and worked as a community activist. She founded the East Lynn Park Farmers market and helped organize an anti-idling campaign at her children's school. She previously worked for Live Green Toronto as a community animator.

Political career 
McMahon was first elected to Toronto City Council in the 2010 city council election, defeating city council speaker Sandra Bussin in Ward 32 Beaches—East York. She describes herself as a "fiscally responsible environmentalist." She served Ward 32 from 2010 to 2018, when she declined to run in the 2018 Toronto municipal election.

In October 2017 McMahon announced she would not be running for re-election in 2018, confirming a promise made when she was first elected in 2010. During her time as a councillor she brought forward two motions to Toronto City Council calling for term limits, but both were defeated.

In October 2020, she announced her candidacy for the Ontario Liberal Party nomination in the provincial electoral district of Beaches—East York. She was elected in the 2022 Ontario general election.

Electoral history

References

External links

1966 births
Artists from Toronto
Canadian animators
Canadian women animators
Canadian women environmentalists
Canadian environmentalists
Women municipal councillors in Canada
Living people
People from Collingwood, Ontario
Toronto city councillors
Women MPPs in Ontario
21st-century Canadian women politicians
21st-century Canadian politicians
Ontario Liberal Party MPPs